Escadron de Transition Opérationnelle 2/8 Nice is a French Air and Space Force (Armée de l'air et de l'espace) Operational Transition Squadron located at Cazaux Air Base, Gironde, France which operates the Dassault/Dornier Alpha Jet.

This Sqn's heritage can be traced back to No. 326 Squadron RAF.

See also

 List of French Air and Space Force aircraft squadrons

References

French Air and Space Force squadrons